Ligger Moreira Malaquias (born 18 May 1988), simply known as Ligger, is a Brazilian football player who plays as a central defender for Bahia.

Club career
Ligger started his career with Guarani de Juazeiro before representing Cianorte in 2011 Campeonato Brasileiro Série D and 2012 Campeonato Brasileiro Série D. He signed for Oeste after the 2012 Série D campaign, and played the last ten game of the title-winning 2012 Campeonato Brasileiro Série C season. He signed a five-year extension with Oeste in May 2013.

On 24 June 2014, Ligger was loaned to Moldovan side Sheriff Tiraspol on a six-month deal with the option of making the move permanent. He returned to Oeste for the 2015 season, and was loaned to Joinville for the 2016 Campeonato Brasileiro Série B season, where he was a regular starter, and one of the main players or the team.

In December 2016 Ligger signed for Fortaleza for the 2017 season. He was a regular starter as the team finished runner-up in 2017 Campeonato Brasileiro Série C and gained promotion, and a regular player the following season as the team were champions of 2018 Campeonato Brasileiro Série B.

Ligger signed for Red Bull Brasil in January 2019, and transitioned to the new Red Bull Bragantino when the merger with Clube Atlético Bragantino took place.

Career statistics

Honours
Oeste
Campeonato Brasileiro Série C: 2012

Sheriff
Moldovan Super Cup: 2014

Fortaleza
Campeonato Brasileiro Série B: 2018

Red Bull Bragantino
Campeonato Brasileiro Série B: 2019

References

External links

1988 births
Living people
Brazilian footballers
Brazilian expatriate footballers
Association football defenders
Moldovan Super Liga players
Campeonato Brasileiro Série A players
Campeonato Brasileiro Série B players
Campeonato Brasileiro Série C players
Campeonato Brasileiro Série D players
Associação Desportiva Recreativa e Cultural Icasa players
Guarani Esporte Clube (CE) players
Cianorte Futebol Clube players
Oeste Futebol Clube players
FC Sheriff Tiraspol players
Joinville Esporte Clube players
Fortaleza Esporte Clube players
Red Bull Brasil players
Red Bull Bragantino players
Esporte Clube Bahia players
Expatriate footballers in Moldova
Brazilian expatriate sportspeople in Moldova